Druid Hills is a home rule-class city in Jefferson County, Kentucky, United States. The population was 308 at the 2010 census. It was incorporated in 1950.

Geography
Druid Hills is located in northern Jefferson County at  (38.264070, -85.662089). It is bordered to the north by Indian Hills, to the east by Louisville, to the south by Bellewood, and to the west by Brownsboro Village. U.S. Route 42 (Brownsboro Road) forms the northern border of Druid Hills, leading west  to downtown Louisville.

Demographics

As of the census of 2000, there were 318 people, 139 households, and 89 families residing in the city. The racial makeup of the city was 99.69% White and 0.31% Asian. Hispanic or Latino of any race were 0.31% of the population.

There were 139 households, out of which 31.7% had children under the age of 18 living with them, 54.0% were married couples living together, 7.9% had a female householder with no husband present, and 35.3% were non-families. 33.1% of all households were made up of individuals, and 18.0% had someone living alone who was 65 years of age or older. The average household size was 2.29 and the average family size was 2.96.

In the city, the population was spread out, with 26.1% under the age of 18, 3.5% from 18 to 24, 27.7% from 25 to 44, 22.3% from 45 to 64, and 20.4% who were 65 years of age or older. The median age was 41 years. For every 100 females, there were 71.9 males. For every 100 females age 18 and over, there were 75.4 males.

The median income for a household in the city was $66,875, and the median income for a family was $83,698. Males had a median income of $68,750 versus $46,250 for females. The per capita income for the city was $41,213. None of the population or families were below the poverty line.

References

External links
 City of Druid Hills official website
 Druid Hills Interactive Map - Kentucky Land Office

Cities in Jefferson County, Kentucky
Populated places established in 1950
Cities in Kentucky
1950 establishments in Kentucky